A. Pradeepkumar was a member of 12th, 13th and  14th Kerala Legislative Assembly from  Kozhikode (North) constituency. He is  Kerala state committee member of  Communist Party of India (Marxist).

Personal life
Son of Shri Gopalakrishna Kurup and Smt. Kamalakshi, born at Chelakkad, Vadakara Taluk on 15 May 1964. He is married to Smt. Akhila P.K.  and has one daughter. He resides at West Hill, Kozhikode.

Political life
Entered politics during school days through S.F.I.; was Secretary, S.F.I., Kozhikode Zamorin's Guruvayoorappan College Unit (1984–86); Chairman, Calicut University Union; Member, Calicut University Senate (1986–87); Secretary, S.F.I. Kozhikode District Committee (1988–90); State President (1990-92), State Secretary and All India Vice-President, S.F.I. (1992–94); Kozhikode District President and Secretary, State Joint Secretary (2000–03), State Secretary, All India Joint Secretary (2003–07), D.Y.F.I.; Member, Kozhikode District Committee and State Committee, CPI(M); Member, Kozhikode District Council; President, Calicut Co-operative Urban Bank (1998-2003); President, Kozhikode District Football Association; Executive Member, District Sports Council, Kozhikode (2003–07); Member, Kerala State Sports Council (2006–09).

References 

Communist Party of India (Marxist) politicians from Kerala
Living people
1964 births
Kerala MLAs 2016–2021